Santiago Papasquiaro is a city located in a valley situated on the eastern slopes of the Sierra Madre Occidental in the state of Durango, Mexico. As of 2010, the city of Santiago Papasquiaro had a population of 26,121, while the municipality has a census population of 48,482 as of 2015. It is the fourth largest community in the state in terms of population, and is the municipal seat of the municipality of the same name. The municipality has an area of 7,238.4 km² (2,794.76 sq mi).

During the past few years, the city's infrastructure has improved vastly. Agriculture is a vital part of the city's economy. Santiago Papasquiaro is also the home of Mexican Army's 71st Infantry Battalion barracks.

Climate

Notable natives
Marlene Favela, model and actress (born in Santiago Papasquiaro)
Silvestre Revueltas, composer, violinist, and conductor (born in Santiago Papasquiaro)
Gabriel Rivera-Barraza, famous fashion publicist & philanthropist in New York City  (born in Santiago Papasquiaro)

References

External links
Gobierno Municipal de Santiago Papasquiaro Official website
Genteymas Night Life in Santiago Papasquiaro

Populated places in Durango
Populated places established in 1597